Liu Caodong (刘曹冬, 22 February 1985 – 8 June 2011) was a Chinese rally driver born in Chongqing. He won the Chinese Rally Championship (CRC) in 2004，2006，2008 and 2010. In 2010, Liu contested in the World Rally Championship (WRC) with the Stobart M-Sport Ford Rally Team driving a Ford Focus RS WRC 08, co-driven by Australian  Anthony McLoughlin. His name was misspelled as “Liu Chao Dong” on the entry list. That was the first time that a Chinese driver had driven a World Rally Car in the championship. He died of a cerebral edema caused by hypoxia alcoholism in 2011 at the age of 26.

WRC results

References

1985 births
2011 deaths
Chinese rally drivers
World Rally Championship drivers

M-Sport drivers